The 2003–04 Maltese Premier League was the 25th season of the Maltese Premier League, and the 90th season of top-tier football in Malta. The league started on 7 September 2004 and finished on 8 May 2005. Sliema Wanderers successfully defended last season's league triumph, surpassing Floriana's league title record of 25 championships.

Teams 
The following teams were promoted from the First Division at the start of the season:
 St. Patrick
 Lija Athletic

From the previous Premier League season, the following teams were relegated to the First Division:
 Balzan Youths
 Ħamrun Spartans

First phase

League table

Results

Second phase

Top Six 

The teams placed in the first six positions in the league table qualified for the Top Six, and the points obtained during the first phase were halved (and rounded up) before the start of second phase. As a result, the teams started with the following points before the second phase: Sliema Wanderers 21 points, Valletta 18, Hibernians 18, Birkirkara 17, Marsaxlokk 15 and Floriana 13.

Play-out 

The teams which finished in the last four league positions were placed in the play-out and at the end of the phase the two lowest-placed teams were relegated to the First Division. The points obtained during the first phase were halved (and rounded up) before the start of second phase. As a result, the teams started with the following points before the second phase: Pietà Hotspurs 10 points, Msida Saint-Joseph 8, St. Patrick 5, Lija Athletic 4.

Season statistics

Top scorers

References

External links
Malta - List of final tables (RSSSF)

Maltese Premier League seasons
Mal
1